Frederick Coe may refer to:

Fred Coe (1914–1979), American television producer and director
Frederick Augustus Coe (1838–1929), English iron works manager
Kevin Coe (born 1947), American convicted rapist, born and became notable under the name Frederick Harlan Coe